The 1973–74 Essex Senior Football League season was the third in the history of Essex Senior Football League, a football competition in England.

League table

The league featured ten clubs which competed in the league last season, no new clubs joined the league this season.

League table

References

Essex Senior Football League seasons
1973–74 in English football leagues